The Phenomenon 1968–1998 (also titled Forever and Ever – 40 Greatest Hits) is a double-CD greatest hits album by Greek singer Demis Roussos, released in 1998 on the label BR Music.

Commercial performance 
The album reached no. 25 in the Netherlands in 1998.

Track listing 

* Tracks 1–6 with Aphrodite's Child.

Charts 
 The Phenomenon 1968–1998

 Forever and Ever – 40 Greatest Hits

References

External links 
 Demis Roussos – The Phenomenon 1968–1998 at Discogs
 Demis Roussos – Forever and Ever – 40 Greatest Hits at Discogs

1998 compilation albums
Demis Roussos albums
BR Music albums